Chinthamakulapalli is a village in Chittoor district of the Indian state of Andhra Pradesh. It is located in Venkatagirikota mandal.

References 

Villages in Chittoor district